The Under-Secretary-General for Humanitarian Affairs and Emergency Relief Coordinator is a high-level position in the United Nations that heads the Office for the Coordination of Humanitarian Affairs.

The current holder is Martin Griffiths of the United Kingdom, who took office in July 2021, following his appointment by UN Secretary-General António Guterres.

History 
The post of Under-Secretary-General for Humanitarian Affairs and Emergency Relief Coordinator (ERC) was created by UN resolution 46/182 in December 1991 to coordinate the efforts of the United Nations, member states and the wider humanitarian community in response to natural and man-made emergencies. The title of "Emergency Relief Coordinator", refers to coordination and aid management responsibilities across both the UN system and the wider assistance community.

The post is one of five cabinet-level UN positions that are traditionally held by nationals from the five permanent members of the Security Council; since 2007, five British nationals have been appointed to that position. Before 2007, British nationals held the position of Under-Secretary-General for Political and Peacebuilding Affairs for more than a decade.

List of Under-Secretaries-General

References

External links 
 List of ERCs, United Nations Library

Emergency management
United Nations Secretariat
United Nations posts